The 1899–1900 Football League season was Aston Villa's 12th season in the Football League First Division, the top flight of English football at the time. Villa finished the season  as Champions.

Sheffield United set the pace this season and built up a six-point lead by the end of December. Villa grew stronger towards the end of the season, losing just one game in their last 13, to leave United in second place by two points. Villa
finished their programme first, leaving a mathematical chance for the Blades if they scored plenty of goals in the last two games. Their last game at Burnley was lost, leaving Villa champions by two points.

Billy Garraty, great-great grandfather of footballer Jack Grealish, was League top scorer this season. Garraty was a local man, signed from Aston Shakespeare, and just 21 years of age this season. He was an industrious player able to play in almost any position – one of the first great "utility" players. He was capped once by England. He scored 96 goals in 224 League games during his career at Villa.

Football League

Trivia
Ever-present: Billy George, Fred Wheldon

First at top: 17 Feb

Players used: 21

External links
AVFC History 1899–1900 season

Aston Villa F.C. seasons
Aston Villa
1900